Povilas Vanagas (born 23 July 1970) is a Lithuanian ice dancer. With his wife Margarita Drobiazko, he is the 2000 World bronze medalist, a three-time Grand Prix Final bronze medalist, a two-time European bronze medalist (2000, 2006), the 1999 Skate Canada champion, and competed in five Winter Olympics, finishing as high as 5th.

Career 
Vanagas began skating at age three. His mother, Lilija Vanagiene, was Lithuania's national skating coach. Vanagas won six national titles in men's singles. At age 18, he was drafted into the Soviet Union army and sent to Moscow, Russian SFSR. Given a choice between becoming a soldier or skating full-time, Vanagas chose to become an ice dancer.

Tatiana Tarasova paired Vanagas with Russian ice dancer Margarita Drobiazko in Moscow. After the breakup of the Soviet Union, they decided to represent Lithuania. Vanagas said, "It was difficult at the beginning because there was a lot of friction between Russia and Lithuania. Since Rita is Russian, it caused many problems." They moved to Kaunas, Lithuania and began training with Elena Maslennikova. In 1995, they began working also in England with Betty Callaway, Jayne Torvill, and Christopher Dean.

In 1999, Drobiazko and Vanagas began spending time with Elena Tchaikovskaia in Moscow, while continuing to work with Maslennikova in Kaunas. They were also coached by Lilija Vanagiene and Anatoliy Petukhov. Drobiazko and Vanagas retired from competition following the 2001–2002 Olympic season, but returned to competition in 2005 to compete at their fifth Olympics. In preparation for the 2005–2006 season, they worked with Maslennikova, Rostislav Sinicyn, Igor Shpilband, Marina Zueva, Gintaras Svistunavicius, and David Liu, in the United States, Germany, Russia, and Lithuania. Drobiazko and Vanagas became the first and only figure skaters to compete at five Olympics. They retired again in 2006 following the World Championships.

Their choreographers included Elena Maslennikova, Jayne Torvill and Christopher Dean, Elena Tchaikovskaia, Tatiana Pomerantseva, Elena Kholina, Yuri Puzakov, Vasily Kleimenov, and Gintaras Svistunavicius.

In the summer of 2022, during the Russian invasion of Ukraine, Vanagas played a role in a ballet Swan Lake on ice with Drobiazko in Sochi that was organized by the Kremlin. On August 10, Lithuania's president Gitanas Nausėda signed a decree stripping off the Order of the Lithuanian Grand Duke Gediminas from both skaters.

Personal life 
Vanagas is fluent in Lithuanian, Russian, Polish, and English. While competing, he was a caregiver for an elderly woman. Vanagas has been married to Drobiazko since June 2000.

Programs 
(with Margarita Drobiazko)

Competitive highlights 
(ice dance with Margarita Drobiazko)

References

External links 

 Drobiazko & Vanagas - Official website
 
 Care to Ice Dance? - Drobiazko & Vanagas

1970 births
Lithuanian male ice dancers
Olympic figure skaters of Lithuania
Figure skaters at the 1992 Winter Olympics
Figure skaters at the 1994 Winter Olympics
Figure skaters at the 1998 Winter Olympics
Figure skaters at the 2002 Winter Olympics
Figure skaters at the 2006 Winter Olympics
Living people
World Figure Skating Championships medalists
European Figure Skating Championships medalists
Sportspeople from Kaunas
Universiade medalists in figure skating
Lithuanian emigrants to Russia
Lithuanian expatriate sportspeople in Russia
Universiade silver medalists for Lithuania
Competitors at the 1993 Winter Universiade